The 1946 United States elections were held on November 5, 1946, and elected the members of the 80th United States Congress. In the first election after World War II, incumbent President Harry S. Truman (who took office on April 12, 1945, upon the death of his predecessor, Franklin D. Roosevelt) and the Democratic Party suffered large losses. After having been in the minority of both chambers of Congress since 1932, Republicans took control of both the House and the Senate.

Results

House of Representatives
Democrats lost fifty-four seats to the Republican Party in the House of Representatives, and Democrats also lost eleven seats to the Republicans in the U.S. Senate, allowing Republicans to take control of both chambers. A Progressive also lost a seat to a Republican.

In California, newcomer Richard Nixon defeated incumbent liberal Democrat  Jerry Voorhis. Nixon campaigned on such issues as price controls, housing, and labor-management relations, but gained his greatest publicity from attacks on Voorhis left-wing Associations and policies.

Another future US president, John F. Kennedy of Massachusetts was first elected to the House of Representatives in this election as well.

Senate 
In Mississippi, Senator Theodore G. Bilbo sought reelection to a third six-year term in the Democratic primary. He was under daily newspaper attack from Hodding Carter, one of the state's best-known political journalists and editors. Carter supported racial segregation but was a moderate on civil rights. His 1946 Pulitzer Prize for editorials on racial and religious tolerance as editor of the Greenville Delta Democrat-Times had won him a national reputation. Bilbo narrowly won reelection with only 51% of the vote, but he died within a year.

In Georgia, white supremacy was the main theme as Eugene Talmadge was elected to a fourth term as governor. He had promoted purges of blacks from the voting lists in certain key Georgia counties.

Long term
The election stymied Truman's efforts to enact his Fair Deal policies and helped ensure the passage of the Labor Management Relations Act of 1947. However, Truman was able to implement the Marshall Plan, the National Security Act of 1947, and other Cold War policies following the election. Future presidents John F. Kennedy and Richard Nixon first won election to Congress in this election, while Thomas Dewey's re-election as Governor of New York helped him earn the 1948 Republican nomination for president. Joseph McCarthy also won election as Senator from Wisconsin in 1946.

See also
1946 United States House of Representatives elections
1946 United States Senate elections
1946 United States gubernatorial elections

References

Further reading
 Leuchtenburg, W. E. "New Faces of 1946: In the midterm elections 60 years ago, war-weary voters turned against the party of an unpopular president and opened Congress to a new crop of lawmakers, including Richard Nixon, John F. Kennedy and Joseph McCarthy." Smithsonian 37.8 (2006): 48-54.

 
1946
United States midterm elections
November 1946 events in the United States